Kool Keith, the American recording artist from The Bronx, has a discography by 2021 that consisted of 39 studio albums, of which 18 were solo projects, and 20 albums in collaboration with other artists. His most recent studio album, Keith's Salon was released in 2021. Kool Keith has collaborated with TomC3, 54-71, Denis Deft, Big Sche Eastwood, L'Orange, Ray West, Thetan, and was in the groups Ultramagnetic MCs, The Cenobites, Ultra, Analog Brothers, Masters of Illusion, KHM/Clayborne Family, Thee Undatakerz, The Diesel Truckers.

Studio albums

Self-released albums

Compilations, EPs and remix albums

Live albums

Mixtapes

Singles

Guest appearances

References

External links 

Hip hop discographies
Discographies of American artists